Galium rotundifolium (round-leaved bedstraw) is a plant species of the Rubiaceae. It is widespread across most of Europe, with the range extending into Morocco, the Caucasus, and southwest Asia from Turkey to Afghanistan. There are also reports of isolated populations in Vietnam, Sabah and Java.<ref>[http://luirig.altervista.org/flora/taxa/index1.php?scientific-name=galium+rotundifolium Altervista Flora Italiana, Galium rotundifolium']</ref>Galium rotundifolium'' is an erect herb. Leaves are broadly ovate, almost round, usually in whorls of 4, with prominent veins. Flowers are in a widely branching terminal panicle. Fruits are green, with long hooked hairs.

References

External links
Tela Botanica
Forum Acta Plantarum
Flora-on Portugal
Flore Alpes, Gaillet à feuilles rondes
Czech Botany, GALIUM ROTUNDIFOLIUM L. – svízel okrouhlolistý / lipkavec okrúhlolistý
Botanik im Bild  /  Flora von Österreich, Liechtenstein und Südtirol, Rundblatt-Labkraut

rotundifolium
Plants described in 1753
Flora of Europe
Flora of Morocco
Flora of Turkey
Flora of Iran
Flora of Afghanistan
Flora of Vietnam
Flora of Borneo
Flora of Java
Flora of Italy
Flora of Spain
Flora of Germany
Flora of Poland
Flora of Ukraine
Flora of Norway
Flora of Sardinia
Taxa named by Carl Linnaeus